Bleak House is an antebellum Classical Revival style house in Knoxville, Tennessee. It is on the National Register of Historic Places.

History
The house was first occupied by Robert Houston Armstrong and his wife, Louisa Franklin. It was built in 1858 for the couple as a wedding gift by the bride's father, Major Lawson D. Franklin. Robert Armstrong's father, Drury Armstrong, gave them the land.  The Armstrongs named the house after Charles Dickens' "Bleak House" novel of the same name. The bricks in the house were molded on-site using slave labor.

The home was used by Confederate Generals James Longstreet and Lafayette McLaws as their headquarters from November 17 to December 4 of 1863 during the Battle of Knoxville. Three Confederate sharpshooters who were stationed in the house's tower were killed by Union cannonballs. Two of the cannonballs are still embedded in the walls, and Civil War-era sketches of the slain soldiers are displayed on the walls of the tower.

The home now belongs to local Chapter 89 of the United Daughters of the Confederacy and is commonly called Confederate Memorial Hall.

Crescent Bend, built by Robert Armstrong's father, Drury, and Westwood, built by Robert's daughter, Adelia Armstrong Lutz, still stand a few blocks from the Bleak House on Kingston Pike.

References
General
 Knoxville: Fifty Landmarks. (Knoxville: The Knoxville Heritage Committee of the Junior League of Knoxville, 1976).
Notes

External links
 Confederate Memorial Hall - Historic Bleak House homepage
 National Register of Historic Places
 http://www.restoreknoxville.com/Neighborhoods/KnoxvilleCollege/tabid/890/Default.aspx
 http://www.discoveret.org/kcwrt/sites/sm-text.htm
 https://www.bleakhouseknoxville.org/who-are-we

Houses in Knoxville, Tennessee
Houses on the National Register of Historic Places in Tennessee
Confederate States of America monuments and memorials in Tennessee
Antebellum architecture
Museums in Knoxville, Tennessee
Historic house museums in Tennessee
Italianate architecture in Tennessee
National Register of Historic Places in Knoxville, Tennessee